Čitluk, Bosnia and Herzegovina is a town and municipality in Herzegovina.

Čitluk may also refer to:

Bosnia and Herzegovina
 Čitluk (Goražde)
 Čitluk (Kozarska Dubica), Republika Srpska
 Čitluk (Posušje)

Croatia
 Čitluk, Sinj
 , a village in the Promina municipality
 Lički Čitluk, Gospić

Serbia
 Čitluk, Kruševac
 Čitluk, Ljubovija, Mačva district
 Čitluk, Mali Zvornik, Mačva district
 Čitluk (Priboj)
 Čitluk (Sjenica)
 Čitluk (Sokobanja)

See also
 Brotnjo Čitluk, a football club based in the town of Čitluk
 Čiflik (disambiguation)
 Čifluk (disambiguation)

Serbo-Croatian place names